Cosmic Force may refer to:


Religion and spirituality
A Supreme Being in systems of thought that do not assume a personal Singular God
Unmoved mover, an Aristotelian concept
A fundamental force or energy postulated in vitalism
A term for "God" or "divinity" in panentheistic spirituality

Arts and entertainment
Power Cosmic, a concept in Marvel Comics
A 1993 record album, see Heartbeat Records
Name of a hip hop group published by Winley Records

Other uses 
The force derivable from dark energy responsible for the accelerating expansion of the universe

See also
Cosmos
Cosmogony
Cosmology
Cosmic energy